The U.S. state of Texas is divided into 254 counties, more than any other U.S. state. Over 20% of Texas counties are generally located within the Houston-Dallas—San Antonio—Austin areas, serving about 20,000,000 people, the majority of the state's population.

Texas was originally divided into municipalities (municipios in Spanish), a unit of local government under Spanish and Mexican rule. When the Republic of Texas gained its independence in 1836, the 23 municipalities became the original Texas counties. Many of these were later divided into new counties. The last county to be initially created was Kenedy County in 1921, but Loving County is the newest organized county; it was first organized in 1893 in an apparent scheme to defraud, abolished in 1897, then reorganized in 1931. Most of these recent counties, especially near the northwest, were created from Bexar County during the 1870s.

Each county is run by a commissioners' court, consisting of four elected commissioners (one from each of four precincts drawn based on population) and a county judge elected from all the voters of the county. In smaller counties, the county judge actually does perform judicial duties, but in larger counties, the county judge functions as the county's chief executive officer. Certain officials, such as the sheriff and tax collector, are elected separately by the voters, but the commissioners' court determines their office budgets, and sets overall county policy. All county elections are partisan; the one exception is the board of trustees of the Dallas County department of education (the Harris County trustees were elected on a nonpartisan basis until 1984).

While the counties have eminent domain power and control all unincorporated land within their boundaries, they have neither home-rule authority nor zoning power. The county is responsible for providing essential services (except for fire and ambulance, which are often supplied by volunteer fire departments). Unlike other US states, Texas does not allow for consolidated city-county governments. Cities and counties (as well as other political entities) are permitted to enter "interlocal agreements" to share services (as an example, a city and a school district may enter into agreements with the county whereby the county bills for and collects property taxes for the city and school district; thus, only one tax bill is sent instead of three). School districts are independent of county and city government (with the exception of the Stafford Municipal School District, which is city controlled).

The Federal Information Processing Standard (FIPS) code, which is used by the United States government to uniquely identify states and counties, is provided with each entry. Texas' code is 48, which when combined with any county code would be written in the form of 48XXX. The FIPS code for each county in the table links to census data for that county.

List

|}

Defunct counties
There have been at least thirty-two counties established by Texas law that no longer exist. These fall into five categories: judicial counties; counties established by the Constitutional Convention of 1868–69; counties never organized which were abolished by legislative act; counties whose territory is no longer considered part of the state; and counties whose names have been changed.

 Buchel County, formed in 1887 from Presidio County. Annexed in 1897 to Brewster County.
 Dawson County, formed in 1858 in what is now Kinney County and Uvalde County and abolished in 1866 (not to be confused with the present-day Dawson County).
 Encinal County, formed in 1856. Abolished in 1899 and annexed to Webb County.
 Foley County, formed in 1887 from Presidio County. Annexed in 1897 to Brewster County.
 Greer County, formed in 1860. Separated from Texas by U.S. Supreme Court ruling in United States v. the State of Texas,  and is now part of southwestern Oklahoma.
 Perdido County, formed in 1824 and forgotten during the upheavals of the 1840s. Perdido was reportedly abolished in 1858 and again in 1871. Records of annexation to Dawson County are also inconclusive.
 Santa Fe County, Texas formed in 1848 from lands claimed by the Republic of Texas and ceded by Mexico. It included a vast area later becoming portions of several states from New Mexico east of the Rio Grande extending northward into south-central Wyoming. Within Texas' modern boundaries, the county included the Trans-Pecos and most of the Panhandle. The county was abolished when Texas ceded its western lands under the Compromise of 1850.
 Wegefarth County, formed in 1873 in the Texas Panhandle and abolished in 1876.
 Worth County, formed in 1850 from part of Santa Fe County. Abolished under the Compromise of 1850 and is now part of east-central New Mexico.

See also

Texas census statistical areas
List of Texas county seat name etymologies
List of counties in Georgia

References

Sources
 - Counties, county seats, county formation, and areas
 - official sites
 - official sites
 - Google Doc

External links
Maps and lists of Texas regions and counties

Texas
 
Counties